Santiago Javier Irala Vera, known as Santiago Irala (born 3 January 1999) is a Paraguayan football player. He plays in Portugal for C.S. Marítimo B.

Club career
He made his Paraguayan Primera División debut for Rubio Ñu on 1 February 2015 in a game against Olimpia.

References

External links
 

1999 births
Living people
Paraguayan footballers
Paraguayan expatriate footballers
Association football forwards
Club Rubio Ñu footballers
FC Porto B players
Club Plaza Colonia de Deportes players
Paraguayan Primera División players
Liga Portugal 2 players
Paraguayan expatriate sportspeople in Portugal
Expatriate footballers in Portugal